New Politics is an American bipartisan 527-organization that recruits, develops, and elects leaders with service backgrounds, either through the military or national service organizations like AmeriCorps or the Peace Corps. It was founded by Emily Cherniack in 2013.

Since its founding, New Politics has raised more than $8.5 million for their endorsed candidates and elected more than 30 of them to office, from local school boards to the U.S. Congress

History and mission 
Emily Cherniack founded New Politics in 2013 to recruit and support National Service alumni and military veterans to re-enter public service through politics. Cherniack's experience working on City Year co-founder Alan Khazei’s unsuccessful bid for the 2010 U.S. Senate special election led her to conclude that the barriers to entry into politics were intentionally exclusive and dissuaded servant leaders from running.

A City Year alum herself, Cherniack chose to focus on building a pipeline of service-oriented leaders after seeing the impact they had on communities.

2014 cycle 
New Politics' first-ever recruit was Marine Corps veteran and now-Congressman, Seth Moulton. Founder Emily Cherniack called Moulton to convince him to run for Congress in his hometown district against Democratic incumbent John F. Tierney. Moulton announced his candidacy for Massachusetts' Sixth Congressional District on July 8, 2013.

Moulton's campaign earned the first-ever political endorsement from retired general and Service Year Alliance Chair Stanley McChrystal. Moulton defeated Tierney in the primary with 50.8% of the vote to Tierney's 40.1% and later defeated Republican challenger Richard Tisei in November's general election.

2016 cycle 
New Politics replicated the Moulton-model in 2016 when they helped elect another Marine Corps veteran, Congressman Mike Gallagher. New Politics ran Gallagher's GOTV push and raised more than $60,000 for his campaign. Gallagher won the general election for Wisconsin's Eighth Congressional District by 63 percent to become New Politics' first Republican officeholder.

2018 cycle 
New Politics had their most successful cycle during the 2018 midterm elections. After a historically large crop of service veterans announced bids for federal office, New Politics partnered with Congressman Moulton to form the Serve America Victory Fund, a joint effort that sought to leverage the platform of a sitting member of Congress along with New Politics’ donor network. Serve America raised more than $5 million for over 20 candidates from across the country.

2020 cycle

Service First Women's Victory Fund 
In 2019, New Politics launched the Service First Women’s Victory Fund (SFWVF), a joint initiative with Representatives Chrissy Houlahan, Elaine Luria, Mikie Sherrill, Elissa Slotkin, and Abigail Spanberger. The group raised more than $650k for the five incumbent members in less than seven months.

Second Service Coalition 
In February 2020, New Politics partnered with nine incumbent House members to launch the Second Service Coalition to raise funds for a slate of first-time veteran Congressional candidates.

References

External links 
 New Politics website

American veterans' organizations
American military personnel
Political organizations based in the United States
Women's political advocacy groups in the United States
527 organizations